The Asian Water Polo Championship is an international water polo tournament, organized by Asia Swimming Federation (AASF). It has been the Asian continental qualification for the Olympic water polo tournament since 2012.

Results

Men

Women

See also
 Water polo at the Asian Games
 Asian Swimming Championships
 Asian Water Polo Cup

References

 
International water polo competitions